The Brazos water snake (Nerodia harteri), also called commonly Harter's water snake, is a species of mostly aquatic, nonvenomous snake in the family Colubridae. The species is endemic to Texas in the United States.

Geographic range
N. harteri is found only in Central Texas in the Brazos River system.

Habitat
The preferred habitat of N. harteri is rocky areas along the Brazos River.

Conservation status
Due to its limited range, N. harteri is considered to be a near-threatened species in Texas.

Etymology
The specific name or epithet, harteri, is in honor of American amateur herpetologist Philip Harter, who collected the first specimen in Palo Pinto County in 1936.

Description
The Brazos water snake grows to a total length (including tail) of 16 to 32 inches (41–81 cm), and ranges in color from brown to olive green. It has two rows of spots that go down either side of its back, and has a pink or orange underside with dark spots down either side.

References

Further reading
Behler JL, King FW (1979). The Audubon Society Field Guide to North American Reptiles and Amphibians. New York: Alfred A. Knopf. 743 pp. . (Nerodia harteri, p. 636 + Plate 549).
Conant R (1975). A Field Guide to Reptiles and Amphibians of Eastern and Central North America, Second Edition. The Peterson Field Guide Series. Boston: Houghton Mifflin. xviii + 429 pp. + Plates 1-48.  (hardcover),  (paperback). (Natrix harteri, p. 149 + Plate 21 + Map 102).
Powell R, Conant R, Collins JT (2016). Peterson Field Guide to Reptiles and Amphibians of Eastern and Central North America, Fourth Edition. Boston and New York: Houghton Mifflin Harcourt. xiv + 494 pp., 47 plates, 207 figures. . (Nerodia harteri, pp. 418–419 + Plate 41).
Schmidt KP, Davis DD (1941). Field Book of Snakes of the United States and Canada. New York: G.P. Putnam's Sons. 365 pp. (Natrix harteri, p. 225).
Smith HM, Brodie ED Jr (1982). Reptiles of North America: A Guide to Field Identification. New York: Golden Press. 240 pp. . (Nerodia harteri, pp. 156–157).
Wright AH, Wright AA (1957). Handbook of Snakes of the United States and Canada. Ithaca and London: Comstock Publishing Associates, a Division of Cornell University Press. 1,105 pp. (in two volumes). (Natrix harteri, pp. 493–497, Figure 145 + Map 42 on p. 512).

External links

Herps of Texas: Nerodia harteri
Biographies of People Honored in the Herpetological Nomenclature of North America

Nerodia
Reptiles described in 1941
Reptiles of the United States